Harold Snyman (23 April 1928 – 1 November 1998) was a major in the South African Security Police.

He led the interrogation of Black Consciousness leader Steve Biko after Biko's arrest in September 1977. He retired with the rank of colonel.

In 1986, he was portrayed in the banned theatre production The Biko Inquest, directed by Saira Essa and Charles Pillay in South Africa. His character was played by a British actor, Andrew Edwards.

After South Africa's transition to democracy, Snyman applied for amnesty from the Truth and Reconciliation Commission but his submission was rejected on the basis of non-disclosure.

He died from stomach cancer on 1 November 1998.

References

1998 deaths
South African police officers
1928 births
Steve Biko affair

Deaths from cancer in South Africa
Deaths from stomach cancer